The 2014 Liga Nusantara Jambi season is the first edition of Liga Nusantara Jambi is a qualifying round of the 2014 Liga Nusantara.

The competition scheduled starts in May 2014.

Teams
This season 15 registered clubs and also some new clubs so as to achieve the target of at least 20 club participants in Jambi.

League table

Result

References 

Jambi